Maria Oshodi (born 1964) is a British writer and theatre director. A guide dog owner, she is Artistic director and CEO of Extant Theatre Company, Britain's only professional performing arts company of blind and partially sighted people.

Life
Maria Oshodi was born in South London in 1964. 

Oshodi's play The 'S' Bend was chosen for the Young Writers' Festival at the Royal Court Festival in 1984. Produced by the Cockpit Youth Theatre in 1985, it was chosen for the first International Festival of Young Playwrights, Interplay '85, held in Sydney.

Blood, Sweat and Fears, a play treating sickle cell anaemia, was written in response to a request from a worker at the Sickle Cell Centre in Lambeth. Ben is a fast-food worker who suffers from sickle cell anaemia, but resists pressure from his girlfriend Ashley to label himself as disabled. Once hospitalized, he has to attempt agency within a health-care system that is ill-informed and discriminatory. The play was first presented by Harmony Arts at the Battersea Arts Centre, with Steven Woodcock playing Ben and Winsome Pinnock also in the cast, before touring England.

Plays
 The 'S' Bend. Longman, 1986.  
 Blood, Sweat and Fears. Methuen, 1989.

References

External links
 Black Plays Archive: Maria Oshodi, National Theatre

1964 births
Living people
English dramatists and playwrights
English theatre directors